AprizeSat is an American micro-satellite platform for low Earth orbit communications satellites. , twelve spacecraft based on the Aprize bus have been launched.

Launch history

References

External links
 SpaceQuest Microsatellite Bus at SpaceQuest.com

Satellites of the United States
Satellite buses